Crosby, Stills & Nash is the debut studio album by the folk rock supergroup Crosby, Stills & Nash (CSN), released in 1969 by Atlantic Records. It is the only release by the band prior to adding Neil Young to their lineup. The album spawned two Top 40 singles, "Marrakesh Express" and "Suite: Judy Blue Eyes", which peaked respectively at No. 28 the week of August 23, 1969, and at No. 21 the week of December 6, 1969, on the US Billboard Hot 100. The album itself peaked at No. 6 on the US Billboard Top Pop Albums chart. It has been certified four times platinum by the RIAA for sales of 4,000,000.

History
The album was a very strong debut for the band, instantly lifting them to stardom. Along with the Byrds' Sweetheart of the Rodeo and the Band's Music from Big Pink of the previous year, it helped initiate a sea change in popular music away from the ruling late-1960s aesthetic of bands playing blues-based rock music on loud guitars. Crosby, Stills & Nash presented a new wrinkle in building upon rock's roots, using folk, blues, and even jazz without specifically sounding like mere duplication. Not only blending voices, the three meshed their differing strengths, David Crosby for social commentary and atmospheric mood pieces, Stephen Stills for his diverse musical skills and for folding folk and country elements subtly into complex rock structures, and Graham Nash for his radio-friendly pop melodies, to create an amalgam of broad appeal. The album features some of their best known songs, including "Helplessly Hoping", "Long Time Gone", "Suite: Judy Blue Eyes", and "Wooden Ships", a collaboration between Crosby and Stills as well as Paul Kantner of Jefferson Airplane.

Stills dominated the recording of the album. Crosby and Nash played guitar on their own songs, while drummer Dallas Taylor played on most tracks except for drummer Jim Gordon on one. Stills played all the bass, organ, and lead guitar parts, as well as acoustic guitar on his own songs. "The other guys won't be offended when I say that one was my baby, and I kind of had the tracks in my head", Stills said. Even with this dominance, Stills does not appear on the tracks "Guinnevere" and "Lady of the Island", both featuring Crosby and Nash only and a precursor to their partnership on record and stage during the 1970s.

David Crosby bristled over the plan for "Long Time Gone" as he thought he should at least play rhythm guitar on his own song. Stills convinced him to go home for a while and when he returned Crosby was won over by the music track that Stills and Taylor had recorded. In a more recent interview, Crosby contradicted his earlier statement, stating that he had played guitar on the track. He is so credited in the liner notes to the 1991 box set.

The group performed songs from the album at the Woodstock festival in August 1969. In late 1969 the group appeared with Neil Young on the Tom Jones' TV show and performed "Long Time Gone" with Tom Jones sharing vocals.

The album proved very influential on many levels to the dominant popular music scene in America for much of the 1970s. The success of the album generated respect for the group within the industry and galvanized interest in signing similar acts, many of whom came under management and representation by the CSN team of Elliot Roberts and David Geffen. Strong sales, combined with the group's emphasis on personal confession in its writing, paved the way for the success of the singer-songwriter movement of the early 1970s. Their use of personal events in their material without resorting to subterfuge, their talents in vocal harmony, their cultivation of painstaking studio craft, as well as the Laurel Canyon ethos that surrounded the group and their associates, established an aesthetic for a number of acts that came to define the "California sound" of the ensuing decade, including the Eagles, Jackson Browne, post-1974 Fleetwood Mac, and others.

The album has been issued on compact disc three times: mastered by Barry Diament at Atlantic Studios in the mid-1980s; remastered by Joe Gastwirt at Ocean View Digital and reissued on August 16, 1994; reissued again by Rhino Records as an expanded edition using the HDCD process on January 24, 2006. On December 6, 2011, a Gold Compact Disc edition of the album was released on the Audio Fidelity label.

Cover
On the cover the members are, left to right, Nash, Stills, and Crosby, the reverse of the order of the album title.  The photo was taken by their friend and photographer Henry Diltz before they came up with a name for the group. They found an abandoned house with an old, battered sofa outside, located at 815 Palm Avenue, West Hollywood, across from the Santa Palm car wash, that they thought would be a perfect fit for their image. A few days later they decided on the name "Crosby, Stills, and Nash".  To prevent confusion, they went back to the house a day or so later to re-shoot the cover in the correct order, but when they got there they found the house had been demolished.

Dallas Taylor can be seen looking through the window of the door on the rear of the sleeve. In the expanded edition, however, he is absent. The original vinyl LP was released in a gatefold sleeve that depicted the band members in large fur parkas with a sunset in the background on the gatefold (shot in Big Bear, California), as well as the iconic cover art. A long folded page inside displayed the album credits, lyrics, track listing, and a quasi-psychedelic pencil drawing.

Release and reception

In a contemporary review, Rolling Stone critic Barry Franklin called Crosby, Stills & Nash "an eminently playable record" and "especially satisfying work", finding the songwriting and vocal harmonies particularly exceptional. Robert Christgau was less enthusiastic in The New York Times, writing that "[Crosby, Stills & Nash] is as perfect as has been expected. But it also demonstrates the dangers of perfection: the wildness that should liberate great rock is so well-controlled that when it appears (as on Nash's excellent 'Pre-Road Downs') it seems to have been inserted just to prove the music is rock: the only exception is Crosby's wailing vocal on 'Long Time Gone.'" In his capsule-review column for The Village Voice, he jokingly said the vocal saves the album from "a special castrati award".

In a retrospective review, Jason Ankeny of AllMusic believed some of the songs' themes "haven't dated well" but "the harmonies are absolutely timeless, and the best material remains rock-solid". In 2003, Rolling Stone ranked Crosby, Stills & Nash number 259 on their list of The 500 Greatest Albums of All Time, then was re-ranked 262nd in 2012. It was voted number 83 in Colin Larkin's All Time Top 1000 Albums 3rd Edition (2000).

Jefferson Airplane guitarist Paul Kantner was finally credited as co-composer of "Wooden Ships" on the expanded edition reissue, something long acknowledged on his group's version of the song from their Volunteers album, released the same year. David Crosby singing an excerpt of "Come On in My Kitchen" between "Long Time Gone" and "49 Bye-Byes" was left off the 2006 expanded reissue at the request of the late Robert Johnson's estate.

Grammy awards

|-
| width="35" align="center"|1970 || Crosby, Stills & Nash (performer) || Best New Artist || 
|-

Track listing

Personnel

Crosby, Stills and Nash (CSN) 
 David Crosby – vocals, guitar on "Guinnevere"; rhythm guitar on "Wooden Ships" and "Long Time Gone"
 Stephen Stills – vocals, guitar, bass, keyboards, percussion all tracks except "Guinnevere" and "Lady of the Island"
 Graham Nash – vocals, rhythm guitar on "Marrakesh Express" and "Pre-Road Downs"; acoustic guitar on "Lady of the Island"

Additional personnel 
 Dallas Taylor – drums on "Suite: Judy Blue Eyes", "Pre-Road Downs," "Wooden Ships," "Long Time Gone," and "49 Bye-Byes"
 Jim Gordon – drums on "Marrakesh Express"
 Cass Elliot – backing vocals on "Pre-Road Downs"

Production 
 Crosby, Stills & Nash – producer
 Bill Halverson – engineer
 Gary Burden – art direction, design
 Henry Diltz – photography
 David Geffen – direction
 Ahmet Ertegün – spiritual guidance
 Barry Diament – mastering, initial compact disc issue
 Joe Gastwirt – mastering, 1994 compact disc reissue
 Raymond Foye – liner notes, 2006 reissue

Charts

Year-end charts

Singles

Certification

References

Crosby, Stills, Nash & Young albums
1969 debut albums
Atlantic Records albums
Grammy Hall of Fame Award recipients
Albums produced by Graham Nash
Albums produced by David Crosby
Albums produced by Stephen Stills
Albums recorded at Wally Heider Studios